(born December 28, 1986, in Osaka Prefecture, Japan) is the female lead singer of Jyukai, a Japanese pop/soft rock group.

Biography 
At an early age, she aspired to be a singer. While she was an elementary pupil, she practiced songwriting and idolized Speed and Namie Amuro.

In 2003, she met her friend, fellow music addict Yoshiaki Dewa. A year later, they formed Jyukai and started doing gigs at Osaka. They were signed by Sistus Records in 2006, while Manami was signed solo at the same label two years later.

She composes her band's songs as the vocalist/composer.

Solo discography

Albums

Singles
"Blue Vibration/Kaze no Memori/to the end of the world" (September 24, 2008, Sistus Records, GNCX-0015)

External links 
 Official Website by Sistus records
 Official Blog by Ameba Blog
 Profile by Rainbow Entertainment

1986 births
Living people
People from Osaka Prefecture
Musicians from Osaka Prefecture
Anime musicians
21st-century Japanese singers
21st-century Japanese women singers